Davi José Silva do Nascimento, or simply Davi (born 10 March 1984 in Fortaleza), is a Brazilian striker who most recently played for Giravanz Kitakyushu.

Club career
Only three seasons after his arrive in Ibaraki, he was released by the club on November 26.

Davi left Giravanz Kitakyushu at the end of 2018.

Career stats in Japan
Updated to 20 February 2019.

Honours
Bahia State League: 2005
J2 League: 2007, 2012

References

External links

Profile at Giravanz Kitakyushu
CBF 
websoccerclub 

1984 births
Living people
Brazilian expatriate footballers
Expatriate footballers in Japan
Brazilian expatriate sportspeople in Japan
Brazilian footballers
Expatriate footballers in China
Brazilian expatriate sportspeople in China
Ceará Sporting Club players
Centro Sportivo Alagoano players
J1 League players
J2 League players
J3 League players
Hokkaido Consadole Sapporo players
Nagoya Grampus players
Ventforet Kofu players
Kashima Antlers players
Matsumoto Yamaga FC players
Giravanz Kitakyushu players
Esporte Clube Vitória players
Association football forwards
Ipatinga Futebol Clube players
Sportspeople from Fortaleza
Umm Salal SC players
Beijing Guoan F.C. players
Chinese Super League players
Qatar Stars League players